The Little Salkehatchie River is a stream in Barnwell, Bamberg, and Colleton counties in the U.S. state of South Carolina. It originates in the Town of Blackville and accepts drainage from
Lake Cynthia, Guess Pond, Brooker Pond, Ghants Branch, Halfmoon Branch, and Long Gall Branch.
Further downstream, the river accepts drainage from Long Pond, Ben Rice Bay, Colston Branch (Ben
Rice Branch, Doussoss Bay, Indian Camp Branch, McMillian Branch), and Long Branch (Little Clear
Pond, Clear Pond).
watershed, all classified freshwater.

References 

Rivers of South Carolina
Rivers of Barnwell County, South Carolina
Rivers of Colleton County, South Carolina
Rivers of Bamberg County, South Carolina